David Bronson (born June 26, 1958) is an American politician, pilot, and retired military officer who is the 9th and current mayor of the Municipality of Anchorage, Alaska.

Early life and education 
Bronson was born in Superior, Wisconsin. He earned a Bachelor of Science degree in agricultural economics from the University of Wisconsin–Madison.

Career 
Bronson served as a pilot in the United States Air Force from 1981 to 1990, as an Air Force Reserve Command plans officer from 1992 to 1993, and an Alaska Air National Guard maintenance officer and pilot from 1993 to 2005, retiring with the rank of lieutenant colonel. He has also worked as a commercial pilot since 1990. In January 2021, Bronson declared his candidacy for mayor in the 2021 Anchorage mayoral election. In the general election, Bronson placed first in a field of 15 candidates. Bronson then narrowly defeated Forrest Dunbar in a May 2021 runoff election. Dunbar conceded the race to Bronson on May 21, 2021. Though Anchorage mayoral elections are nonpartisan, Bronson is a registered Republican.

Mayor of Anchorage

The month after Bronson took office, he revoked a paid parental leave policy for city workers.

During the COVID-19 pandemic, Bronson has declined to enact mask or vaccine requirements, saying that it was a matter of personal choice. He also said he would not get a vaccine, calling it "experimental".

During an Anchorage Assembly meeting on September 29, 2021, he defended the use of Star of David holocaust imagery worn by those opposed to a municipal mask mandate. On October 1, he ordered a stop to water fluoridation in Anchorage based on reports of dangers. He allowed it to resume when he discovered that it is mandated by Anchorage's municipal code.

Personal life
Bronson and his wife, Debra, have two children. They are members of the Anchorage Baptist Temple.

Electoral history

References 

1958 births
Alaska Republicans
Living people
Mayors of Anchorage, Alaska
People from Superior, Wisconsin
United States Air Force officers
University of Wisconsin–Madison alumni
Military personnel from Wisconsin